The 1972 Amateur World Series was the 20th Amateur World Series (AWS), an international men's amateur baseball tournament. The tournament was sanctioned by the International Baseball Federation (which titled it the Baseball World Cup as of the 1988 tournament). The tournament took place, for the third time, in Nicaragua, and was won by Nicaragua national baseball teamtheir 1st championship .

There were 16 participating countries.

Final standings

References
World Cup Nicaragua  

World Cup
Baseball World Cup
1972
1972 in Nicaraguan sport
Sport in Managua